Yuseph Williams 'Boela' Abrahams (born 23 July 1988) is a South African rugby union player for the  in the Currie Cup and Rugby Challenge.

He was released at the end of 2011 and joined  for the 2012 Varsity Cup, but rejoined the Kings a few months later on a two-year deal.

He joined Welkom-based side  in 2014. He was a key member of their 2014 Currie Cup First Division-winning side. He played in the final, scoring a try and kicking a decisive drop goal in the last ten minutes of the match to help the Griffons win the match 23–21 to win their first trophy for six years.

A few days later, Abrahams was invited to join a Springbok training camp prior to their end-of-year tour to Europe.

References

1988 births
Living people
Eastern Province Elephants players
Rugby union players from Port Elizabeth
South African rugby union players
Rugby union scrum-halves